Gantömöriin Oyuungerel (born 19 May 1992) is a Mongolian swimmer. She was competing for Mongolia at the 2012 Summer Olympics. She is a member of the Church of Jesus Christ of Latter-day Saints.

References

External links
 

Mongolian female swimmers
Swimmers at the 2012 Summer Olympics
Olympic swimmers of Mongolia
1992 births
Living people
Mongolian Latter Day Saints
Swimmers at the 2010 Asian Games
Asian Games competitors for Mongolia
21st-century Mongolian women